Jinju So clan was one of the Korean clans. Their Bon-gwan was in Jinju, South Gyeongsang Province. According to the research in 2015, the number of Jinju So clan was 50,357. , a 130th descendant, built Jinhan confederacy. After that, a 29th descendant of So Baek-son, began Jinju So clan when he served as a government official in Goryeo.

See also 
 Hyeokgeose of Silla

References

External links